The Democratic Renewal Party (Indonesian: Partai Demokrasi Pembaruan (PDP)) was a political party in Indonesia. It was established in 2005 by former members of the Indonesian Democratic Party – Struggle (PDI-P) who were once close aides of party leader Megawati Sukarnoputri. Following the 2005 PDI-P congress, differences appeared over the nature of democratic methods within the party. A group of people, including Petrus Selestinus, took the view that although the PDI-P was a modern political party, it still used the old authoritarian methods such as giving absolute prerogative rights to the party chairman and having only one candidate for senior positions. This group then established the Democratic Renewal Party. Unlike the PDI-P, it had a system of collective leadership, with 35 people forming the national leadership.

The party contested the 2009 elections, but won only 0.9 percent of the vote, less than the 2.5 percent electoral threshold, meaning it gained no seats in the People's Representative Council.

Following its poor result in the 2009 vote, the party joined nine other smaller parties to form the National Unity Party.

References

External links
Party website (Indonesian)
Activity Photos

2005 establishments in Indonesia
Defunct political parties in Indonesia
Pancasila political parties
Political parties established in 2005
Political parties with year of disestablishment missing